

2009 Angola Men's Basketball Cup
The 2009 Men's Basketball Cup was contested by 13 teams and won by Primeiro de Agosto, thus defending its title. The 2-leg final was played on April 14 and 17, with a playoff match played on April 18 after both teams were tied with a win each.

Preliminary rounds

Final round

2009 Angola Women's Basketball Cup
The 2009 Women's Basketball Cup was contested by four teams, with the 2-leg cup final, decided by playoff at the best of three games. Primeiro de Agosto was the winner.

See also
 2009 Angola Basketball Super Cup
 2009 BAI Basket
 2009 Victorino Cunha Cup

References

Angola Basketball Cup seasons
Cup